The Miss North Carolina USA competition is the pageant that selects the representative for the state North Carolina in the Miss USA pageant.  This state is part of the RPM Productions group since 1992.

In 2005, Miss North Carolina USA Chelsea Cooley won the Miss USA crown and placed in the top 10 at Miss Universe.  Cooley is the first former Miss North Carolina Teen USA to win the Miss title, although not the first to have competed at Miss Teen USA. The second Miss North Carolina Teen USA to win the Miss title was Erin O'Kelley in 2007. She went on to place in the top 15 at Miss USA 2007. Similar to the Miss Utah USA titleholders, both Cooley and Kelley placed at Miss USA, eclipsing their teen performances. In 2009, Kristen Dalton became the second woman from North Carolina to be crowned Miss USA. In 2019, Cheslie Kryst became the third woman from the state to win Miss USA. In both occasions, they placed top 10 on their respective Miss Universe pageants. The most recent placement was Morgan Romano placing 1st runner-up in 2022.

North Carolina is currently third tied with Idaho in number of former teens have competed in this pageant: eight, after Indiana and Virginia, including three competed at Rhode Island, Vermont and Virginia, respectively. In addition, two others have also competed at Miss America.

In 2019 (billed as 2020 pageant), Madeline Delp was the first woman in a wheelchair to win the top 10 finalists in a statewide Miss USA pageant.

Jordyn McKey of Charlotte was crowned Miss North Carolina USA 2023 on February 25, 2023, at High Point Theater in High Point, North Carolina. She will represent North Carolina for the title of Miss USA 2023.

Gallery of titleholders

Results summary

Placements
Miss USAs: Chelsea Cooley (2005), Kristen Dalton (2009), Cheslie Kryst (2019) 
1st runners-up: Caelynn Miller-Keyes (2018), Morgan Romano (2022)
2nd runners-up: Constance Ann Dorn (1975), Lynn Jenkins (1994), Ashley Puleo (2004)
3rd runners-up: Lyndia Ann Tarlton (1960)
4th runners-up: Marcia Burton (1974)
 Top 6/8: Pat Arnold (1991), Madison Bryant (2021)
 Top 10/11/12: Deborah Ann Falls (1972), Dianne Jamerson (1979), Cookie Noak (1984), Rhonda Nobles (1986), Tess Elliott (1992), Ashley Love-Mills (2013)
 Top 15: Shirley Bagwell (1956), Erin O'Kelley (2007)

North Carolina holds a record of 20 placements at Miss USA.

Awards
Miss Photogenic: Pat Arnold (1991)
Miss Congeniality: Vera Morris (1998), Monica Palumbo (2001)

Winners 
Color key

Notes

External links

References

North Carolina
North Carolina culture
Women in North Carolina
Recurring events established in 1952
1952 establishments in North Carolina
Annual events in North Carolina